Beebe Plain is a divided village on the Quebec-Vermont border.

Beebe Plain may also refer to:
 Beebe Plain, Quebec, the Canadian part of the village, now part of Stanstead
 Beebe Plain, Vermont, the American part of the village, an unincorporated community
 Beebe Junction on the Massawippi Valley Railway